Lumbert Hill is a mountain located in the Catskill Mountains of New York west of Delhi. Dunk Hill is located southwest, The Cobble is located south, and Johnson Hill is located west of Lumbert Hill.

References

Mountains of Delaware County, New York
Mountains of New York (state)